Alexander Hollaender (9 December 1898 – 6 December 1986) was one of the world's leading researchers in radiation biology and in genetic mutations. In 1983 he was given the Enrico Fermi Award by the United States Department of Energy for his contributions in founding the science of radiation biology, and for his leadership in promoting "scientific exchanges" between American scientists and scientists from developing countries.

Hollaender was born in Samter, German Empire (Szamotuły, Poland), he emigrated to the US in 1921.
In 1939 Hollaender published research showing that the mutations of spores of the ringworm fungus occurred in the same spectrum as the absorption spectrum of nucleic acids indicating that nucleic acids form the building blocks of genes. A young Esther M. Zimmer, who worked with Dr. Hollaender at the U. S. Public Health Service (Bethesda, MD), published with Dr. Hollaender, Eva Sansome and Milislav Demerec in this very early field of x-ray- and UV-induced mutations. Later on, Esther M. Zimmer (now Esther Lederberg) became one of the most influential founders of bacterial and bacteriophage (Lambda phage) genetics. Later on, Hollaender worked at Oak Ridge National Laboratories with M. Laurance Morse, who himself later went on to collaborate with Esther Lederberg.

His research was not appreciated for its discovery at the time, and later scientists reports were necessary before science accepted the role of nucleic acids as the genetic material. Historians of science now realize his early discovery, and his Fermi Award recognized this discovery.

In 1981 Hollaender established the Council for Research Planning in Biological Sciences, and was its president at the time of his death from a pulmonary embolism in 1986. The US National Academy of Sciences gives the Alexander Hollaender Award in Biophysics every three years in his honor.

References

External links
National Academy of Sciences Biographical Memoir

1898 births
1986 deaths
Radiobiologists
American biophysicists
People from Szamotuły 
People from the Province of Posen
People from Oak Ridge, Tennessee
German emigrants to the United States
Members of the United States National Academy of Sciences
Enrico Fermi Award recipients
Deaths from pulmonary embolism